Officers Club, The Officers Club or similar may refer to:

 Military officers' club, a military base building intended for off-duty use by officers while excluding personnel of lower rank
 The Officers Club, a UK menswear retailer, part of Blue Inc.
 Officers' Club (Belgrade), a building in Belgrade, Serbia
 Officers Club, Dhaka, a government (and related) officers' club in Bangladesh
 Camp Breckinridge Non-Commissioned Officers' Club, a historic clubhouse in Morganfield, Kentucky
 Fort Totten Officers' Club, a historic clubhouse in Queens, New York
 Officers Club Services Ground, a cricket ground in Hampshire, England
 Police Officers Club Stadium, a multi-use stadium in Dubai
 Mountain View Officers' Club, a historic clubhouse at Fort Huachuca, Arizona